The RDS Cup is awarded annually by the Quebec Major Junior Hockey League to the overall Rookie of the Year. The Cup was known as the Molson Cup from 1991 to 1994, and the New Face Cup from 1994 to 1996, but is now sponsored by the French-language sports network Réseau des sports (RDS).

Winners

References

External links
 List of trophy winners (QMJHL official website)

Quebec Major Junior Hockey League trophies and awards
Rookie player awards
Awards established in 1991